Cary Smith (born September 22, 1968) from Jackson, Wyoming, is an American ski mountaineer and member of the United States Ski Mountaineering Association (USSMA) ski team. Together with Pete Swenson, Chris Kroger and Steve Romeo he finished ninth in the relay event of the 2006 World Championship of Ski Mountaineering.

References 

1968 births
Living people
American male ski mountaineers